Luboš Tomíček, Sr. (1934-1968) was an international speedway rider from Czechoslovakia.

Speedway career 
Tomíček reached the final of the Speedway World Championship in the 1965 Individual Speedway World Championship. He was also the captain of the Czechoslovakian team and champion of Czechoslovakia five times from 1961 until 1965 after winning the Czechoslovakian Championship.

During the 1968 Golden Helmet of Pardubice he was killed in an accident after falling directly under the wheels of the speedway rider behind him. An annual memorial event has been held in his memory since.

World final appearances

Individual World Championship
 1965 –  London, Wembley Stadium – 16th – 2pts

World Team Cup
 1960 -  Göteborg, Ullevi (with Jaroslav Machač / František Richter / Antonín Kasper Sr.) - 3rd - 15pts (4)
 1961 -  Wrocław, Olympic Stadium (with Antonín Kasper Sr. / Stanislav Svoboda / Bohumír Bartoněk) - 4th - 12pts (7)
 1962 -  Slaný (with Berdich Slany / Karel Prusa, Sr. / Jaroslav Volf / Bohumír Bartoněk) - 4th - 16pts (7)
 1963 -  Vienna, Stadion Wien (with Stanislav Kubíček / Miroslav Šmíd / Antonín Kasper Sr. - 2nd - 27pts (5)
 1968 -  London, Wembley Stadium (with Antonín Kasper Sr. / Jaroslav Volf / Jan Holub I) - 4th' - 7pts (2)

Family
His grandson Luboš Tomíček Jr. (born 1986) was also an international speedway rider.

See also
Rider deaths in motorcycle racing

References 

1934 births
1968 deaths
Czech speedway riders